The Second Aliyah (HaAliyah HaShniya) was an aliyah (Jewish emigration to Palestine) that took place between 1904 and 1914, during which approximately 35,000 Jews immigrated into Ottoman-ruled Palestine, mostly from the Russian Empire, some from Yemen.

The Second Aliyah was a small part of the greater emigration of Jews from Eastern Europe which lasted from the 1870s until the 1920s. During this time, over two million Jews emigrated from Eastern Europe. The majority of these emigrants settled in the United States where there was the greatest economic opportunity. Others settled in South America, Australia, and South Africa and only a small fraction of Jews who migrated went to Palestine.

There are multiple reasons for this mass emigration from Eastern Europe and the most commonly talked about is the growing antisemitism in Russia and the Pale of Settlement. The manifestations of this antisemitism were various pogroms, notably the Kishinev pogrom and the pogroms that attended the 1905 Russian Revolution. The other major factor for emigration was economic hardship. The majority of the Jewish population of Eastern Europe was poor and they left in search of a better life. Jews left Eastern Europe in search of a better economic situation which the majority found in the United States.

Palestine on the other hand offered very limited economic incentives for new immigrants. Palestine was not a place for poor immigrants to come and better their economic situation because there was very little industry. Thus, the majority of the Jewish immigrants found a livelihood through working the land. Many of the European Jewish immigrants during the late 19th-early 20th century period gave up after a few months and went back to their country of origin, often suffering from hunger and disease. David Ben Gurion estimated that 90% of the Second Aliyah “despaired of the country and left”.

Settlement
Many of the Second Aliyah immigrants were idealists, inspired by the revolutionary ideals then sweeping the Russian Empire who sought to create a communal agricultural settlement system in Palestine; others were evading conscription into the Tzarist Russian army. In 1906 there were 13 Jewish agricultural settlements all owned or administered by the Jewish Colonisation Association and funded by Baron Edmond de Rothschild. In 1907 it is estimated there were 550 active pioneers The first kibbutz, Degania, was founded in 1909.

Most of those arriving were married, many with children; 40% were women. Few had any resources and many remained destitute.
Some of the immigrants, such as Akiva Aryeh Weiss, who preferred to settle in the new district created Ahuzat Bayit near Jaffa, which was later renamed as Tel Aviv. In 1914 it had a Jewish population of 2,000.

Wider immigration and Zionism
There is a large misconception that Zionism played a major role in the immigration of Jews to the Land of Israel during The Second Aliyah. While Zionism may have had some influence, it cannot be viewed as a substantial factor of influencing emigration to Ottoman Syria when looking at the greater context of Jewish emigration from Eastern Europe. The two major reasons for Jewish emigration were poverty and persecution and Ottoman Syria did not offer a respite from either. Jews emigrating from Eastern Europe often experienced much hardship on their way to their destinations, especially those going to Palestine. Ottoman government had been negative to the migration of Jews ("Yishuv") to Palestine from late 19th c. till the end of the 1st World War. One of the reasons was that most of the Jews had foreign citizenship, which curtailed the Empire's ability to deal with them and enforce Ottoman law. Expulsions, deportations, arrests, denial of Ottoman nationality were some of the measures used to contain the Jewish immigration. Among the deportees were David Ben-Gurion and Yitzhak Ben-Zvi.

The idea that the Second Aliyah was a realization of the zionist movement does not take all the hardships endured by the immigrants into account. Because of this, the majority of Jewish emigrants went to the United States where there was much more economic opportunity. Between the years 1907-1914 almost 1.5 million Jews went through Ellis Island, while only about 20,000 immigrated to Palestine. 

The word Aliyah in Hebrew means ascent, which has the idealistic connotation of returning to the ancient Jewish homeland, reflected by Zionism. In reality Zionism had little influence on Jewish immigration to the Land of Israel during that period. As the Zionist movement gained strength through the 20th century, more Jews immigrated to the Land of Israel as a result. However, during the Second Aliyah period, 1904-1914, Zionism did not play a big role in influencing Jewish immigration. One of Ben Gurion's biographers states that there were only a few hundred idealists like Ben Gurion, totaling fewer than half the number of Templers living in Palestine at the time.

Culture
The Second Aliyah is largely credited with the revival of the Hebrew language and establishing it as the standard language for Jews in Israel. Eliezer Ben-Yehuda contributed to the creation of the first modern Hebrew dictionary. Although he was an immigrant of the First Aliyah, his work mostly bore fruit during the second.  

Ya'acov Ben-Dov became the first filmmaker to work in Hebrew.

The Second Aliyah also established the first Hebrew high school in Israel, the Herzliya Hebrew High School in Tel Aviv.

Prior to the First World War it is estimated that more than 40,000 of the Jews in Palestine held Russian citizenship.

Defense
The Second Aliyah created the security organization, HaShomer, which became the precedent for future Jewish defense organizations such as the Haganah.

References

Further reading 
 Ben-Gurion, David,  From Class to Nation: Reflections on the Vocation and Mission of the Labor Movement  (Hebrew),  Am Oved (1976)

Second
Jews and Judaism in Europe
Jews and Judaism in Yemen
Jews and Judaism in Ottoman Palestine
1900s in Ottoman Syria
Jews and Judaism in Ottoman Galilee